This is a list of prominent Pakistani scientists.

A
 Abdul Majid, rocket scientist and engineer
 Abdul Qadeer Khan, metallurgical engineer
 Abdullah Sadiq, nuclear physicist 
 Abdus Salam, theoretical physicist (Nobel Laureate 1979)
 Ahmad Hasan Dani, archaeologist 
 Ansar Pervaiz, nuclear scientist
 Arif Zaman, mathematician and statistician 
 Asad A. Abidi, electrical engineer
 Asghar Qadir, mathematician and cosmologist
 Atta ur Rehman Khan, computer scientist 
 Atta ur Rahman, organic chemist

F
 Faheem Hussain, theoretical physicist
 Fayyazuddin, theoretical physicist

H
 Hakeem Muhammad Saeed, medical researcher
 Haroon Ahmed, electrical engineer

I
 Irfan Siddiqi, physicist in quantum measurement & nano-science
 Ishfaq Ahmad, nuclear physicist
 Ishrat Hussain Usmani, nuclear physicist
 Ismat Beg, mathematician

J
 Javaid Laghari, electrical engineer
 Javed Iqbal Kazi, renal pathologist

K
 Kushnood Ahmed Siddiqui, scientist

M
 M. A. B. Beg, theoretical particle physicist
 Muhammad Iqbal Choudhary, organic chemist
 Muhammad Suhail Zubairy, physicist in quantum optics
 Muhammad Yar Khohaver, chemist
 Mujahid Kamran, theoretical physicist
 Munir Ahmad Khan, nuclear engineer

N
 Nazir Ahmed, nuclear physicist
 Nergis Mavalvala, astrophysicist
 Naweed Syed, neuroscientist

P
 Pervez Hoodbhoy, nuclear physicist
 Peter Finke, particle physicist

Q
 Qasim Mehdi, molecular biologist

R
 Rafi Muhammad Chaudhry, nuclear physicist
 Rayid Ghani, computer scientist
 Raziuddin Siddiqui, astrophysicist
 Riaz-ud-Din, theoretical physicist

S
 Salim Mehmud, nuclear scientist
 Salim-uz-Zaman Siddiqui, chemist
 Samar Mubarakmand, nuclear physicist
 Shahid Hussain Bokhari, computer systems engineer
 Sultan Bashiruddin Mahmood, nuclear and controls engineer
 Syed Tajammul Hussain, chemist and nano-technologist
 Sarfaraz K. Niazi, biopharmacist

T
 Tasneem M. Shah, theoretical physicist
 Tasneem Zehra Hussain, string theorist
 Tariq Mustafa, nuclear scientist

U
 Umar Saif, computer scientist

See also
Science and technology in Pakistan

References

 
Lists of Asian scientists
Scientists